The Bastion of Truth Reformed Churches in the Philippines is a denomination of Christian churches all located in Southern Luzon, the Philippines.

Origin 
Representatives from three former Pentecostal-Charismatic churches and from another group with an Arminian Baptist background convened in April 2004 to formally organize a separate denomination of Reformed Churches. The B.T.R.C.s stand in the tradition of the Protestant Reformation of the 16th Century. Their eventual establishment as a Reformed denomination originated in the doctrinal conflicts within the Church of the Foursquare Gospel in the Philippines, a Pentecostal-Charismatic and a fundamentally and thoroughly Arminian denomination founded in the United States by  woman preacher Aimee Semple McPherson, over the essential issue of God's sovereignty in man's salvation specifically in the aspect of the believer's preservation or perseverance in his saved state unto the end and the Biblical practice of “Christ-centered” preaching (see Chapell: Christ-Centered Preaching). Both were rejected by the Foursquare denomination. These “Reformed” (Calvinistic) ideals gradually made their way into the instructions of one of this Pentecostal denomination's Bible Colleges through the introduction of some Reformed literature alongside a growing acquaintance with Church history centering on the dramatic period of the Protestant Reformation. Pastors who stood their ground resigned their posts while some Bible College students abandoned their ministerial training being the result of the doctrinal conflict.

Foremost among them who stood for the Reformed doctrines which led to the founding of the Bastion of Truth Reformed Churches is Pastor Ronald R. Santos. He was “associate Pastor” at Capitol City Foursquare Church; Director and instructor at Foursquare Bible College of Quezon City. Refusing to retract from the truth he believed to be a matter of life-and-death—heaven-and-hell itself—he opted to resign his office, a much coveted position. Being the person who never drew attention to himself, his marked life of integrity, humility, wisdom, diligence in the study of the Scriptures and an ardent love for God and His Truth drew the confidence of a small band of men and women and led them into that eternally significant turning point of their lives.

Beliefs

The Bastion of Truth Reformed Churches confess and defend God's only and true Gospel of sovereign particular irresistible grace (see Engelsma's A Defense of Calvinism as the Gospel) which is His “power” unto the salvation of those who believe (Romans 1:16, 17; 1 Corinthians 15:1, 2). They are convinced that in these darkest of times when the substance of the Gospel  is rampantly obscured and corrupted the true Church must unashamedly declare and confess her unambiguous and absolute message bearing in mind that salvation is impossible itself apart from a sure and certain knowledge of the truth. The Bastion of Truth Reformed Churches therefore believe and confess the true Biblical Gospel to be:

“the good news that God, out of unmerited favor and love, according to His own eternal purpose, has fulfilled His promise to sovereignly bestow the blessings of salvation to His elect people yet lost, guilty, defiled and hell-deserving sinners, freely giving them the Holy Spirit, Who works in them new birth, faith, repentance, sanctification unto good works and perseverance therein, without any merit of their own and on the basis of no works or willing which they perform, but only through the righteousness of the Lord Jesus Christ freely imputed to them alone and received by God-given faith based upon His eternal determination to glorify his own name”

In the light of this genuine Gospel and its ramifications the B.T.R.C.s acknowledge as their official statement of faith the historic Reformed creeds known as the “Three Forms of Unity”: The Belgic Confession of Faith (1561), the Heidelberg Catechism (1563) and the Canons of Dordt (1618–1619).

The B.T.R.C.s acknowledge that the faithful bearer of this glorious Gospel in the last 450 years is the historic Reformed Faith proclaimed by faithful Reformed and Presbyterian churches holding fast to the faith of the apostolic church. They unashamedly identify themselves as “Reformed” Churches although the term “Reformed” has been claimed by so many apostate modern Protestant churches. Their reason for this is that the significant and colossal battles for Biblical truth were bound within the historical circumstances of the Protestant Reformation of the sixteenth century.

Church Government

The doctrinal standards, church government and worship of the Bastion of Truth Reformed Churches are set forth in their Church Order. Although they believe in the priesthood of all believers (1 Peter 2:9), they firmly hold that God calls certain men (Romans 10:14, 15; 1 Timothy 3:1-13) through the church to fulfill the tasks of the distinct Biblical offices. Office-bearers (i.e. pastors [or ministers of the Word], ruling elders, and deacons) are required to subscribe to this church order. The denomination holds to the Presbyterian form of church government and convene on significant occasions as a single classis. The B.T.R.C.s emphasize that each congregation is self-governed by a body of elders chosen out of the congregation in compliance with the principle of the “autonomy of the local congregation”. Hence, the name of the denomination—not “Church” (singular), but “Churches” (plural). While they esteem highly the worth and ministry of women they do not allow them to be preachers, elders or deacons (1 Timothy 2:9-15; Titus 2:3-5) (see Cammenga's Women in Church Office).

Worship

In deepest gratitude to God for giving them such a great salvation, the Bastion of Truth Reformed Churches render unto Him the worship He deserves.

Their worship liturgy is simple, but significant. The elements of worship—prayer, singing, preaching, and giving—are taught in the Bible as belonging to worship, and therefore, they use only these elements in their worship.

Their worship services are characterized by solemnity and respect for God and for His Word. Their focal point is the preaching of God's Word, which He uses to instruct them in the truth of salvation and to call them to constant repentance and faith in Jesus Christ. In this way God strengthens them, encourages them, and helps them to know Him better.

As a matter of Biblical principle the B.T.R.C.s do not offer human entertainment in their worship services. The Bastion of Truth Reformed Churches, who themselves mostly came out from Pentecostalism/Charismaticism, denounce this movement's man-centered, entertainment-motivated, sense-stimulated and emotion-oriented worship which now rampantly and wildly spreading like fire in modern churches. They therefore refuse incorporating into their worship services unwarranted elements such as clapping of hands, special (song) numbers (by adults and children), tambourine presentations, interpretative dances, choir performances, puppet presentations, drama and pantomime presentations, banner pageantries, altar call, and other abominable forms of false and idolatrous worship. They are thankful to the Lord for liberating them from such “will-worship” (Colossians 2:23), while in mercy leading them into embracing the beauty of Reformed worship which is solely regulated by the written Word of God, not by the caprice and innovations of carnal men (see Engelsma, et al.’s, Reformed Worship). For this reason the B.T.R.C.s practice the Biblical heritage of Psalm singing without the accompaniment of musical instruments.

References

External links 
 Website of the Bastion of Truth Reformed Churches in the Philippines
 History of the Bastion of Truth Reformed Churches in the Philippines

Christian denominations founded in the Philippines
Protestant denominations established in the 21st century
Christian organizations established in 2004
Reformed denominations in the Philippines
Evangelical denominations in Asia